The Christian Church of West Liberty, at 304 Prestonsburg St. in West Liberty in Morgan County, Kentucky, was listed on the National Register of Historic Places in 2010.

The church was destroyed in a tornado of March 2, 2012.

A newly constructed West Liberty Christian Church was dedicated on April 9, 2016.

References

Churches on the National Register of Historic Places in Kentucky
National Register of Historic Places in Morgan County, Kentucky
2012 disestablishments in Kentucky
Demolished but still listed on the National Register of Historic Places
Former buildings and structures in Kentucky
West Liberty, Kentucky
Buildings and structures destroyed by tornado